Kris Boeckmans (born 13 February 1987) is a Belgian former professional road bicycle racer, who rode professionally between 2010 and 2020, for the , ,  and  teams.

Career
Born in Malle, Boeckmans began competing as a professional in the second half of the 2009 season, competing for the  team as a stagiaire. He joined  for the start of the 2010 season, remaining with the team until the end of 2011, when he joined the  squad for the 2012 season. Boeckmans made his Grand Tour début at the 2012 Tour de France, where he was earmarked as one of the squad's main sprint contenders, along with Kenny van Hummel; Boeckmans took his first top ten placing on stage 4, when he finished eighth on the stage.

He started the 2015 Vuelta a España. However, on the eighth stage, he was involved in a large crash: he was drinking from a bidon and hit a hole in the road, falling hard to the ground. According to Cyclingnews.com, he suffered "facial trauma and fractures, a concussion, broken ribs and a punctured lung" and was placed into an induced coma. He was kept in the coma for over a week and was eventually discharged around four weeks after the crash, following major facial surgery in Belgium.

Major results

2007
 2nd Zellik–Galmaarden
2008
 1st GP Stad Vilvoorde
 1st Stage 1b Vuelta a Navarra
 5th Overall Tour de Berlin
1st Stage 1
 7th ZLM Tour
 9th Grand Prix de Waregem
 10th Kattekoers
2009
 1st  Road race, UEC European Under-23 Road Championships
 1st  Overall Le Triptyque des Monts et Châteaux
1st Stage 2b
 1st Schaal Sels
 1st Stage 2 Vuelta a Navarra
 2nd Overall Ronde van Antwerpen
1st Stages 1a (ITT) & 3
 2nd Brussel–Zepperen
 2nd Paris–Tours Espoirs
 4th GP Raymond Impanis
 5th Kattekoers
2010
 1st Stage 5 Ster Elektrotoer
 2nd Overall Driedaagse van West-Vlaanderen
1st Stage 3
 2nd Nokere Koerse
 7th Scheldeprijs
 8th Omloop van het Waasland
 8th Nationale Sluitingsprijs
 9th Wanzele-Lede
 10th Dwars door Drenthe
 10th Grand Prix de Denain
2011
 3rd Münsterland Giro
 4th Puivelde Koerse
 6th Sparkassen Giro Bochum
 9th Omloop Gemeente Melle
2012
 2nd Le Samyn
 2nd Nokere Koerse
2013
 2nd Le Samyn
 5th Schaal Sels
 6th Halle–Ingooigem
2014
 2nd Halle–Ingooigem
2015
 1st  Overall Tour de Picardie
1st Stages 1 & 3
 1st  Overall World Ports Classic
1st  Points classification
1st Stage 2
 1st Le Samyn
 1st Nokere Koerse
 2nd Halle–Ingooigem
 3rd Overall Étoile de Bessèges
1st Stage 1
2016
 5th Kampioenschap van Vlaanderen
2018
 5th Halle–Ingooigem
2019
 6th Scheldeprijs

Grand Tour general classification results timeline

References

External links

Vacansoleil-DCM profile

Belgian male cyclists
1987 births
Living people
Cyclists from Antwerp Province
People from Malle